Shooting targets are objects in various forms and shapes that are used for pistol, rifle, shotgun and other shooting sports, as well as in darts, target archery, crossbow shooting and other non-firearm related sports. The center is often called the bullseye. Targets can for instance be made of paper, "self healing" rubber or steel. There are also electronic targets that electronically can provide the shooter with precise feedback of the shot placement.

History 
Most targets used in shooting sports today are abstract figures of which origins often are not given much thought, but given the military and hunting origins that started most shooting disciplines it is not hard to understand that many of the targets at some point originally resembled either human opponents in a battle or animals in a hunting situation. For instance, the well known circular bullseye target might originally have resembled a human torso or an animal being hunted. Notable instances of shooting targets with martial origins which are considered abstract today, are the field targets used in Det frivillige Skyttervesen where the original intent was to resemble amongst other wheels of vehicles (S25 target), barrels (tønne), bunker openings (stripe 30/10 and 13/40) or enemy personnel (1/3, 1/4, 1/6 and 1/10 figure, minismåen, etc.). The origin of these targets are not usually given

Types of targets

by Action 

Stationary/static target
Dynamic target
 Running target - target is moving sideways (examples are defunct disciplines 100 metre running deer, 10 meter running target...) 
 Moving target (example is defunct discipline moving target small-bore rifle)
 Disappearing target (example is defunct discipline disappearing target small-bore rifle)
 Flying target (used in skeet, trap, double trap)

by Reactivity
 Non-reactive
 Paper target — ordinary disposable paper-based target with painted pattern for bullseye shooting, may be made from paperboard/cardboard, corrugated board or even fiberboard, and usually single-use and purchased in large quantities.  Requires mounting onto a rack, a hanger, a wire or a backboard during use.
 Foam target — usually cubic in shape, made from high-density styrofoam, foam rubber or laminated corriboard, and primary used for archery.
 3D target — animal/human-shaped mannequin, commonly made from plastic/fiberglass, corkwood or high-density styrofoam/foam rubber, though some exotic models (e.g. the infamous "The Ex") have elaborately designed internal contents resembling anatomical organs, skeletons and blood and may even be overmolded with ballistic gelatin.  More frequently placed in a shooting range or field for 3D archery.  
 Reactive — designed to produce a visible or audible response when hit, usually by generating a sharp sound or by moving and/or bouncing along the ground.  They are frequently used for silhouette shooting and plinking, and can involve anything from proper competition/commercial products to casual objects such as tin cans, glass bottles, bowling pins, golf balls, metal barrels/plates or anything random that draws the shooter's attention.
 "Splatter" target — dual-lamination paper targets with an overlayer of dark-colored background (most often black, also dark blue) and a light-colored underlayer (often white or fluorescent yellow) separated by a plastic film.  When hit by a bullet, the plastic film around the impact hole edge shrivels to expose the brighter underlayer, creating around the hole a high-contrast jagged rim that looks like splattered paint, and allows easier observation from distance.
 Steel targets — also known as "gongs", these will make loud sharp sounds that are audible from distance and (sometimes) movements when hit.  Popular in action shooting, metallic silhouette, long range shooting and various field target/field shooting disciplines.
 Bouncing targets — freely moving targets made from a type of "self-healing" elastomer material, which roll/flip and bounce along the ground when shot with a bullet.  Commonly used in quick-firing plinking exercise with semi-automatic firearms and airguns, as the rolling/bouncing movements are often unpredictable and helpful in training for rapid aim re-establishment for follow-up shots.
 Explosive targets — containers loaded with binary explosive (e.g. Tannerite) that are designed to detonate and release a small brief fireball when punctured by a bullet traveling with sufficient terminal energy.  Dye powder are often added to produce a puff of colored smoke to enhance the visual effect.  Flammable gas (e.g. propane/butane) bottles, which can produce a visible jet of flame when shot, can sometimes be used, but these carry a significant fire safety risk.
Balloons can often serve as a weak explosive target, as they are very cheap and visible (and disappear in a very obvious way when hit), and when punctured the rapid pressure release also produces an audible pop.  There are also commercial air compressor devices that pressurize plastic bottles to produce a much louder boom when the bottle is breached by a bullet. Similarly, water balloons and used paperboard cartons/plastic jugs filled with water can also hydrostatically create a visible (and sometimes quite spectacular) splash when shot with a high-power bullet.
Interactive — various targets are displayed on a bullet-proof screen that capture the impacts.  The impacts are visible on the target screen and on the remote monitor via an electronic scoring system. It's called by many names: 'multi-functional virtual target system', 'interactive live fire shooting simulator', 'live fire targeting system', 'interactive video projection shooting range wall'...

by Material
 Paper or cardboard
 Steel targets - metal silhouettes
 Foam - used in 3D archery
 Frangible (such as clay or tiles)
 Self-healing rubber target
Electronic
 Explosive - Targets are designed to explode when stuck with a bullet traveling at a suitable velocity to induce detonation.

by Realism
 2D
paper or metal silhouettes
 3D - usually models of real life animals in archery.

by Color

Mostly important for paper targets.
 yellow, red, blue, black and white rings
 yellow, red and blue rings
 yellow and black rings
 white and black rings
 ...

Archery sports

World Archery Federation 
FITA targets are used in archery shooting competitions within the World Archery Federation. The targets have 10 evenly spaced concentric rings, generally with score values from 1 through 10. In addition there is an inner 10 ring, sometimes called the X ring. This becomes the 10 ring at indoor compound competitions, while outdoors, it serves as a tiebreaker with the archer scoring the most X's winning. The number of hits may also be taken into account as another tiebreaker. In FITA archery, targets are coloured as follows:

 1 & 2 ring: White
 3 & 4 ring: Black
 5 & 6 ring: Blue
 7 & 8 ring: Red
 9, 10 & inner 10 (X) ring: Gold

3D archery targets 
3D targets are life-size models of game used in field archery.

Dart 
Dart targets are a special form of bullseye targets.

Firearm sports

Air rifle field targets 
In the outdoor air gun discipline field target metal targets of various shape and forms are used. The metal plates are often shaped to resemble small game animals, although there is currently a move towards simple geometric shapes.

Clay pigeons 
Clay pigeons are clay discs thrown into the air to imitate flying game birds for various clay pigeon shooting disciplines (e.g. trap, skeet, sporting clays), formally known as Inanimate Bird Shooting.

International Confederation of Fullbore Rifle Associations 
In fullbore target rifle within the International Confederation of Fullbore Rifle Associations (ICFRA), competitions can be held in either a short range or long range format, with distances either in yards or meters. F-Class shoots at the same targets as Palma, but during the scoring process an extra inner ring (which is half the diameter of the V-bull) counts only for F-Class. While short range is shot at a different target size for each of the six distances, long range is shot at the one and same type of target at different distances. Below are the official target sizes, and approximate subtensions in milliradians and arcminutes depending on distance.

Metric ICFRA International Match Targets and F-Class Targets (Short Range) at metric distances:

Metric ICFRA International Match Targets and F-Class Targets (Short Range) at imperial distances:

The Metric ICFRA International Match Target and F-Class Target (Long Range) at metric and imperial distances:

International Practical Shooting Confederation 
In matches organized by the International Practical Shooting Confederation, both steel and paper targets are used. Currently the only paper targets used for handgun is the IPSC Target (formerly Classic Target) and the 2/3 scaled down IPSC Mini Target (formerly IPSC Mini Classic Target). The center of these paper targets is called the A-zone. Additionally, for rifle and shotgun "A3" and "A4" paper targets and the "Universal Target" is used. For steel targets, standardized knock down targets called "poppers" are used. The two approved designs are the full size "IPSC Popper" (formerly IPSC Classic Popper) and the 2/3 scaled down version "IPSC Mini Popper" (formerly "IPSC Classic Mini Popper"), while the Pepper Popper and Mini Pepper Popper is now obsolete.

International Shooting Sport Federation 
Within the International Shooting Sport Federation mostly various bullseye targets are used, with variances depending on disciplines. For shotgun clay targets are used.

Metallic silhouette 
In metallic silhouette shooting only knock down steel targets featuring animals are used.

Popinjays 
The Popinjay (from the French papegai, or "parrot") is an ancient form of target for crossbow shooting. Originally a bird tethered in a tree, it developed into a complex painted wood target atop a tall wooden pole. The popinjay would form the centrepiece of a major shooting contest and many shooters would try their skill repeatedly against the same target. Scoring was awarded for shooting off various parts of the target.

Human silhouette 
Human silhouette targets are use for military, police and civilian firearms training.

Mannequins
Mannequins are sold for use as practice targets. Examples include The Ex, which resembles a woman, and another resembling former United States President Barack Obama.

See also 
 Electronic target
 Shot grouping
Plinking
 Scoring gauge
 Steel target
 Texas sharpshooter fallacy

References

External links 
 Targets on Wikimedia Commons
 Scatt online viewer and database

Targets and targeting
Archery
Darts terminology